Imazato Station (今里駅) is a railway station on Kintetsu Railway's Osaka Line in Ikuno-ku, Osaka, Japan.

Lines
Kintetsu Railway
Osaka Line (D05)
Nara Line (A05)

Layout
This station has an island platform serving two tracks between two side platforms serving two tracks elevated.

Adjacent stations

Ikuno-ku, Osaka
Railway stations in Osaka
Railway stations in Japan opened in 1914